SRH Presents: Spaded, Jaded, & Faded is the second official compilation album by Suburban Noize Records released on October 29, 2002. This album includes popular names of the label, such as the Kottonmouth Kings, Judge D, and Sen Dog along with others.

MTV Internships
• Slim dispensary industries legal internships

Track listing

References

2002 compilation albums
Suburban Noize Records compilation albums